Jessie is a given name in its own right, but may also be a nickname for the given name Jessica. It is generally considered the feminine form of Jesse. The name Jess is also a given name. It, or Jesse, may be used in Spanish as a nickname for the male name Jesus.

People
 Jessi (musician) (born 1988), also known as Jessica H.O., South Korean–American singer and rapper
 Jessie Armstead (born 1970), American football player
 Jessie Bates (born 1997), American football player
 Jessie Britt (born 1963), American football player
 Jessie Brown Pounds (1861–1921), American writer of gospel songs
 Jessie Buckland (1878–1939), New Zealand photographer
 Jessie Buckley, Irish entertainer and I'd Do Anything finalist
 Jessie Camacho, American Survivor contestant
 Jessie Cooper (1914–1993), Australian politician
 Jessie Daniel Ames (1883–1972), American civil rights activist
 Jessie Evans (basketball), American basketball coach
 Jessie Earl (died 1980), English female murder victim
 Jessie Foster (born 1985), Canadian sex worker
 Jessie Franklin Turner (1881–1956), American fashion designer
 Jessie Godderz (born 1986), American actor and professional wrestler 
 Jessie Greengrass (born 1982), British poet and author
 Jessie Mae Hemphill (1923–2006), American musician
 Jessie Hester (born 1963), American football player 
 Jessie Hollins (1970–2009), American baseball player
 Jessie J (born 1988), British singer
 Jessie Lemonier (born 1997), American football player
 Jessie Loutit (born 1988), Canadian rower
 Jessie MacWilliams (1917–1990), English mathematician
 Jessie Mackaye, American actress
 Jessie Matthews (1907–1981), British actress and singer
 Jessie McKay (born 1989), Australian professional wrestler, ring name Billie Kay
 Jessie Misskelley (born 1975), one of the West Memphis 3
 Jessye Norman (1945–2019), American opera singer
 Jessie Fremont O'Donnell (1860–1897), American writer
 Jessie Oonark (1906–1985), Canadian Inuit artist
 Jessie Pharr Slaton (1908–1983), African-American lawyer.
 Jessie Pope (1868–1941), English World War I poet
 Jessie M. Rattley (1929–2001), American mayor
 Jessie Redmon Fauset (1882–1961), American writer
 Jessie Rogers (born 1993), Brazilian-American pornographic actress
 Jessie Rooke (1845–1906), Australian suffragette and temperance reformer
 Jessie Royce Landis (1896–1972), American actress
 Jessie L. Simpson (1882–1974), staff member in the United States Senate
 Jessie Tuggle (born 1965), American football player
 Jessie Usher (born 1992), American actor
 Jessie Wallace (born 1971), British actress
 Jessie Ward (born 1979), American professional wrestler
 Jessie Ward (born 1982), American actress
 Jessie Ware (born 1984), British singer-songwriter
 Jessie Weston (1850–1928), British scholar and folklorist
 Jessie Weston (1867–1939), New Zealand novelist and journalist
 Jessie E. Woods (1909–2001), American pilot

Fictional characters 
 Jessie (Pokémon)
 Jessie (Toy Story), in the Toy Story franchise
 Jessie Prescott, main character of the TV series Jessie
 Jessie Jackson (Coronation Street), in the soap opera Coronation Street
 Jessie (Clay Kids), in the Spanish animated TV series Clay Kids
 Jessie Burlingame, in the Stephen King novel Gerald's Game
 Jessie Burlingame, in the 2003 horror film Wrong Turn
 Jessie Cates, in the 1983 play 'night, Mother
 Jessie McCarney, in the 2006 video game Dead Rising
 Jessie Maye, a dateable character in the dating simulation videogame Huniepop
Jessie, boyfriend of titular love interest in 1981 song Jessie's Girl
Jessie, unlockable character in the mobile video game Brawl Stars
Jessie, titular character in the sitcom Jessie (2011 TV series)

See also
 Jess (disambiguation)
 Jesse (disambiguation)
 Jessica (disambiguation)
 Jessie (disambiguation)
 Jessi (disambiguation)
 Jesus (disambiguation)

References

English given names
English feminine given names
Hypocorisms